Arild Nyquist (6 March 1937 – 21 December 2004) was a Norwegian novelist, poet, writer of children's books and musician.

Biography
He was born in Oslo, the son of Arild Otto Nyquist (1911–74) and  Gerd Nyquist (1913-84). 
His father was a shipbroker and his mother a novelist. He grew up on Røa just outside Oslo. 
At the age of 23, Nyquist began working at the Norwegian National Academy of Craft and Art Industry to train was an artist. However this education was interrupted. He was employed as a formation teacher at a primary school at Stamsund in Lofoten (1968-1976).
In 1960, he married   Anne-Kari Mosebekk, daughter of artist  Olav Mosebekk  (1910- 2001).

He made his literary debut in 1963 with the novel Ringer i et sommervann. Nyquist was awarded Mads Wiel Nygaards Endowment in 1971. He was nominated for the Nordic Council's Literature Prize in 1994 for the self-biographic novel Ungdom.

He died in Asker on 21 December 2004.

Selected works
Nå er det jul igjen! og andre dikt (1972)
Kelner! (1979
Havet. Et dikt om livet og døden (1985)
I avisen (1981)
Reisen til Drammen (1982)
 Flyvende fru Rosenkranz (1983)
Jeg heter Arild (1990)Knapphuset'' (1995)

References

1937 births
2004 deaths
Writers from Oslo
Musicians from Oslo
Oslo National Academy of the Arts alumni
Grappa Music artists
Norwegian male novelists
Norwegian male poets
Norwegian male musicians
20th-century Norwegian novelists
20th-century Norwegian poets
20th-century Norwegian male writers